Dean Karlan is an American development economist. He is Professor of Economics and Finance at Northwestern University where, alongside Christopher Udry, he co-founded and co-directs the Global Poverty Research Lab at Kellogg School of Management. Karlan is the president and founder of Innovations for Poverty Action (IPA), a New Haven, Connecticut, based research outfit dedicated to creating and evaluating solutions to social and international development problems. He is also a Research Fellow and member of the Executive Committee of the board of directors at the Abdul Latif Jameel Poverty Action Lab (J-PAL) at the Massachusetts Institute of Technology. Along with economists Jonathan Morduch and Sendhil Mullainathan, Karlan served as director of the Financial Access Initiative (FAI), a consortium of researchers focused on substantially expanding access to quality financial services for low-income individuals.

On 15 of November 2022 he was nominated USAID Chief Economist 

Together with Abhijit Banerjee, Esther Duflo, Michael Kremer, John A. List, and Sendhil Mullainathan, he has been a driving force in advancing field experiments as an important methodology to discover causal relationships in economics. He is also a co-founder of stickK.com and co-founder of ImpactMatters, which, counter to other evaluators which focus on overhead costs, instead prioritized cost-effectiveness analysis.

Education 
Karlan received a Ph.D. in Economics from the Massachusetts Institute of Technology., an M.B.A. and an M.P.P. from the University of Chicago, and a B.A. in International Affairs from the University of Virginia. Karlan attended the Duke University Talent Identification Program from 1982–1985.

Academic research

Development Economics 
Karlan's research focuses on the areas of development economics, behavioral economics and international development policy. He has studied microeconomic issues of financial decision-making, specifically employing randomized controlled trials (RCTs) to examine what works and what does not and why with respect to interventions and businesses intended to address problems in society. Internationally, he focuses on microfinance, and domestically he focuses on voting, charitable giving, and commitment contracts.

In microfinance, Karlan has studied the following topics: interest rate policy, credit evaluation and scoring policies, entrepreneurship training, group versus individual liability, savings product design, credit with education, and impact from increased access to credit and savings. His work on savings and health typically uses insights from psychology and behavioral economics to design and test specialized products.

Karlan has published extensively "Graduation" programs, a set of anti-poverty programs which provide a multifaceted, complementary set of interventions including a productive asset, training, coaching, access to savings, consumption support and in some cases mental health treatment. A six-country study found that these programs cause lasting progress out of poverty for the very poor.

In 2007, Karlan received the Presidential Early Career Award for Scientists and Engineers and in 2008 he received the Alfred P. Sloan Research Fellowship. He has consulted for the World Bank, the Asian Development Bank, FINCA International, Oxfam USA, and the Guatemalan government. Karlan is also co-Founder of StickK, a company that manages incentive-based employee wellness programs and public campaigns for health living, and enables users to make commitment contracts in order to reach their personal goals. He is also the co-author of the economics book More Than Good Intentions published by Dutton Press released in April 2011. Karlan is also a member of the Finance research programme at the International Growth Centre, a research centre based jointly at The London School of Economics and Political Science and the University of Oxford, which brings academics and policy-makers together.

Charity Efficacy and Effective Altruism 
Karlan's research intersects with effective altruism, and many of the development interventions recommended by effective altruist organizations such as GiveWell and The Life You Can Save are based on studies conducted by Innovations for Poverty Action. Karlan has studied and written about how to increase the quality and quantity of giving. His research has shown that nonprofits with high overhead rates are extremely rare, that cost-effectiveness information can increase donations and that a match from a high profile organization (in this case, The Bill & Melinda Gates Foundation) can increase donations.

Karlan co-founded ImpactMatters with Elijah Goldberg in 2015. ImpactMatters produced estimates of impact and corresponding ratings, and was acquired by Charity Navigator in 2020.

Selected works

Books 

 Karlan, Dean; Morduch, Jonathan (2019). Economics — Third Edition. McGraw-Hill Education. 978-1260566062.
 Karlan, Dean; Gugerty, Mary Kay (2018). The Goldilocks Challenge: Right-Fit Evidence for the Social Sector. Oxford University Press. 978-0199366088.
 Karlan, Dean; Appel, Jacob (2016). Failing in the Field: What We Can Learn When Field Research Goes Wrong. Princeton University Press. 978-0691161891.
 Karlan, Dean; Appel, Jacob (2011). More Than Good Intentions: How a New Economics Is Helping to Solve Global Poverty. Dutton. 978-0525951896.

References

External links 
 Dean Karlan's Home Page

21st-century American economists
American development economists
Living people
MIT School of Humanities, Arts, and Social Sciences alumni
University of Chicago Booth School of Business alumni
University of Virginia alumni
Duke University alumni
Yale University faculty
Massachusetts Institute of Technology fellows
Center for Global Development
Year of birth missing (living people)
University of Chicago Harris School of Public Policy alumni
Recipients of the Presidential Early Career Award for Scientists and Engineers